Gianluca Pozzi (born 17 June 1965) is a former tennis player from Italy, who turned professional in 1984.

Pozzi won one singles title (1991, Brisbane) and one doubles title (1991, Newport) during his career. The left-hander reached his highest individual ranking on the ATP Tour on 29 January 2001, when he became World No. 40.

During his career, Pozzi notably defeated Grand Slam champions Andre Agassi, Ivan Lendl, Marat Safin, Sergi Bruguera and Roger Federer. And in 2000 Pozzi, at the age of 35, memorably reached the Round of 16 on grass at Wimbledon, prompting Italian tennis journalist Dr. Giovanni Clerici to write that "Nonno" Gianluca ("Grandfather" Gianluca) had won a great victory there.

ATP career finals

Singles: 2 (1 title, 1 runner-up)

Doubles: 2 (1 title, 1 runner-up)

ATP Challenger and ITF Futures Finals

Singles: 19 (10–9)

Doubles: 6 (2–4)

Performance timelines

Singles

Doubles

External links
 
 
 

1965 births
Living people
Italian male tennis players
Olympic tennis players of Italy
Sportspeople from Bari
Tennis players at the 2000 Summer Olympics